Niladevi, also rendered as Neela Devi, is a Hindu goddess, and a consort of the preserver deity Vishnu, along with Sridevi and Bhudevi. In Vishnu's avatar as Krishna, Niladevi is either regarded as Nagnajiti, the consort of Krishna in Dvārakā or in some accounts as Radha, the consort of Krishna in North Indian traditions. 

She is primarily revered in South India, particularly in Tamil culture, as one of Vishnu's consorts. In Sri Vaishnava tradition, all three consorts of Vishnu are regarded as aspects of Lakshmi.

Legend 
According to regional traditions, Niladevi took the incarnation of Nagnajiti, a wife of Krishna. In Sri Vaishnavism, Nagnajiti is also called Nappinnai (Pinnai, a favourite gopi of Krishna in Tamil tradition). 

Niladevi appears in the Vaikhanasa Agama text. Some texts mention that Vishnu's iccha shakti takes three forms: Sridevi, Bhudevi, and Niladevi, representing the three gunas; The Sita Upanishad mentions that these three forms as those of goddess Sita; Niladevi is associated with tamas. Niladevi, besides tamas, is associated with the sun, the moon and fire. She appears as Krishna's Gopi in Cherusseri Namboothiri's Krishnagatha.

According to a dhyana mantra of Vishnu, in his Param aspect, he is depicted seated on the serpent Shesha with Sridevi on his right and Bhudevi and Niladevi on his left. Niladevi may be also depicted standing behind Vishnu with his two co-wives. In a depiction in the British Museum, Vishnu as Vaikuntha-Natha ("Lord of Vaikuntha") is seated on Adishesha between Sridevi and Bhudevi, while his foot is supported by Niladevi. 

The Alvar Andal is sometimes considered by the Sri Vaishnava denomination as an aspect of Niladevi.

Nappinnai
Niladevi's aspect of Nappinnai is mainly limited to Tamilakam. The name Nappinnai is found in the Divya Prabandham of the Alvars and Silappadikaram. According to these texts, Andal (one of the Alvars) wanted to offer her devotion to her patron deity Krishna just as the Braj gopis did in Dvapara Yuga. In her Tiruppavai, Andal wakes up Nappinai before waking up Krishna. As per Sri Vaishnavism, complete surrender to God is performed through his consort, and in the case of Krishna specifically, it is performed through Nappinai.

Niladevi took the avatar of Nappinnai, the daughter of Kumbagan (the brother of Yashoda). Krishna won Nappinnai's hand after conquering the seven ferocious bulls of her father. Nappinnai's brother is Sudama. Parasara Bhattar describes Krishna, intoxicated by her beauty, with the epithet "Neela thunga sthana giri thati suptham" (lit. "He who rests on the breasts of Nappinnai").

Velukkudi Swamy, a proponent of Vishishtadvaita philosophy, says that Andal, singing Nachiyar Tirumoli as gopi in Thiruppavai mentioned only Nappinnai. This stands for the identification of Nappinnai as Radha. Alvar mentions the three nachiyars (consorts) as Ponmangai (Sridevi), Pulamangai (Bhudevi) and Nilamangai (Niladevi). Niladevi is mentioned to be the goddess of senses. It is Niladevi who keeps mind stable by offering him her bliss.

References

Lakshmi
Hindu goddesses
Consorts of Vishnu
Tamil deities